AS Police is the name of a number of sports clubs based in French-speaking countries of Africa. It may refer to:

Basketball
AS Police (basketball, Mali) in Mali

Football
AS Police (Bamako) in Mali
AS Police (Brazzaville) in the Republic of the Congo
AS Police (Dakar) in Senegal; formerly known as ASC Police and ASF Police
AS Police (Libreville) in Gabon
AS Police (Niamey) in Niger
AS Police (Ouagadougou) in Burkina Faso
AS Police (Pointe-Noire) in the Republic of the Congo
AS Police (Porto-Novo) in Benin
ASC Police, Nouakchott, Mauritania, formerly known as AS Police

See also
Police FC (disambiguation)